Arthur Nesbitt may refer to:

 Arthur Deane Nesbitt (1910–1978), Canadian businessman and pilot
 Arthur Russell Nesbitt (1883–1962), Ontario lawyer and political figure
 Arthur James Nesbitt (1880–1954), Canadian businessman and philanthropist